Tiernan (Irish: Ó Tiarnáin, also spelled Tirnan) is an Irish family name. The name descends from "tiarna", the Irish word for "lord". The name is also used as a forename.

Notable people with the surname Tiernan include:
Andrew Tiernan (born 1965), English actor
Dan Tiernan (fl. 2020 - ), English stand-up comedian
Bob Tiernan, American politician
Cate Tiernan (born 1961), pen name of Gabrielle Charbonnet, American author
Fergus Tiernan (born 1982), Scottish football midfielder 
Frances Christine Fisher Tiernan (1846–1920), pen name "Christian Reid", American novelist, author
Greg Tiernan (born 1965), Irish-born-Canadian-based animator, director, voice actor
Jonathan Tiernan-Locke (born 1984), British cyclist
Mary Spear Nicholas Tiernan (1835–1891), American writer
Mike Tiernan (1867–1918), American professional baseball player
Robert Tiernan (1929–2014), American lawyer, politician 
Tommy Tiernan (born 1969), Irish comedian, actor, writer, presenter

Notable people with the forename Tiernan include:
Tiernan Brady, Irish-Australian LGBT rights campaigner
Tiernan Killeen (born 2003), Irish hurler
Tiernan McCann (born 1991), Irish Gaelic footballer
Tiernan O'Halloran (born 1991), Irish rugby player

See also
 McKiernan Clan
 McKernan (surname)
 Tiernan, Oregon, named for R. Tiernan
 McKiernan
 McTiernan
 McTernan
 Kiernan
 Kernan (disambiguation)